Paludisphaera is an aerobic genus of bacteria from the family of Isosphaeraceae with one known species (Paludisphaera borealis). Paludisphaera borealishas been isolated from Sphagnum peat from the Yaroslavl region in Russia.

See also 
 List of bacterial orders
 List of bacteria genera

References

Bacteria genera
Monotypic bacteria genera
Planctomycetota